The Directors Guild of Great Britain (DGGB) was a professional organization that represented directors across all media, including film, television, theatre, radio, opera, commercials, music videos, corporate film/video and training, documentaries, multimedia and "new technology". It had evolved to become an independent trade union and a non-profit limited company, asset-linked to the Directors Guild Trust, the charity arm of the Guild. The Guild closed in 2015 and ceased operations in March 2017. The Directors Charitable Foundation continues the charity work of the Guild.

Foundation
The DGGB was founded in 1983 by a group of leading British directors who were dissatisfied by poor representation by technical trade unions. The first meeting was at Ronnie Scott's Jazz Club in London, where they agreed directors needed an independent voice and that directors would be best represented by their own organization.

Purpose
The DGGB continued to be instrumental in working to improve directors’ terms, conditions, and remuneration. In 1987, they established The Directors & Producers Rights Society (DPRS) and initiated the TV directors’ rights strike in 2000, creating an industry-wide alliance of the Guild, BECTU and the DPRS, which had brought about new residual block payment agreements with the main UK TV broadcasters and production companies and an industry-wide Directors Forum and has generated contract advice guides and a "code of practice" guideline for directors in television drama and non-fiction programming. Through specific motion picture, television, theatre, and radio groups, the Guild had produced model contracts, guides and provides advice across all live and recorded media. In 2008 the DPRS became the Directors UK, now the foremost industrial negotiating body for British recorded media directors.

Guild members had an interest in the broad nature of the directing profession and reflected this diversity in the nature of its members and in their training events. The Guild had championed understanding and respect for the work of directors both within their own industry and throughout the public at large. It sponsored workshops, master classes, seminars, one-on-one mentoring, as well as conducting screenings, gala events and presenting periodic "lifetime achievement awards" to recognize outstanding British directors.

The Guild was based in central London.

Guild member categories
Guild member categories were Professional (who have credits for at least two professional productions as the primary director), or Associate (supporting members who do not have their two professional credits, those working in the industry or those with a professional or academic interest in the craft of directing), who hail from the United Kingdom, as well as directors from a few other countries who support the goals of the Guild, many of whom are influenced or inspired by the British directing aesthetic or style.

Lifetime Achievement Awards
Over its 25 years, the Guild had staged ten Lifetime Achievement Awards honouring individual directors, as well as two large-scale Guild Award ceremonies to honour outstanding directors in a variety of categories.

Those awards were presented to the following:
 1993   Fred Zinnemann
 1994   Roy Boulting
 1995   Joan Littlewood
 1996   Christopher Morahan
 1997   Sir Richard Eyre
 1998   Alan Parker
 1999   Stanley Kubrick
 2001   Peter Brook
 2002   John Schlesinger
 2003   Sir Trevor Nunn
 2005   Sam Mendes

Blue plaques
The Directors Guild Trust was the charity arm of the Guild supporting both Guild activities and the wider remit of promoting British directors' art and craft to a national and international public, through education, events, commemorations, and memorials.

The Trust has erected blue plaque memorials to:
 2005 Michael Powell
 2006 Alexander Mackendrick
 2008 David Lean
 2011 Brian Desmond Hurst
 2013 John Schlesinger
 2013 Joan Littlewood

References

External links
 Directors Guild of Great Britain website

1983 establishments in the United Kingdom
Entertainment industry unions
Film organisations in the United Kingdom
Guilds in the United Kingdom
Organisations based in the London Borough of Richmond upon Thames
Television organisations in the United Kingdom
Trade unions established in 1983
Twickenham